Michael ("Mike") Harvey (born 5 December 1962) is a retired male speed walker from Australia.

He set his personal best (3:57.20) in the men's 50 km in 1993. His best international result was an eleventh in the 1984 Summer Olympics. Harvey is a five-time national champion in the men's 50 km event.

Achievements

References

External links
 

1962 births
Living people
Australian male racewalkers
Athletes (track and field) at the 1984 Summer Olympics
Olympic athletes of Australia